{{Infobox person
| image         = Shoshana Ungerleider Oscars 2019 by Edward Aten.png
| caption       = Ungerleider on the Oscars Red Carpet in 2019
| name          = Shoshana Rebecca Ungerleider
| post-nominals = MD
| occupation    = Physician, journalist, film producer
| spouse        = Edward Aten
| notable_works = Host, TED (conference) HealthEnd GameExtremisRobin's Wish}}
Shoshana R. Ungerleider is an American medical doctor, journalist and film producer. She was educated at The University of Oregon and Oregon Health and Science University. As of June 2021, Ungerleider is the host of the TED Health Podcast, practices internal medicine, runs a non-profit that she founded, End Well, and during the COVID-19 pandemic, contributed regularly as a medical expert on CNN, MSNBC, CBS and Fox News.

Early life and education

Ungerleider was born in Eugene, Oregon, to Jewish American parents. She is the daughter of American documentary film producer, author and sports psychologist Steven Ungerleider, and Sharon Margolin Ungerleider and  granddaughter of Joy Ungerleider-Mayerson, author and Jewish philanthropist, and great granddaughter of D. Samuel Gottesman, a Hungarian-born, American pulp-paper merchant, financier and philanthropist

Career
Ungerleider practices internal medicine in San Francisco at Sutter Health's California Pacific Medical Center and is president of a non-profit organization she founded in 2017 called End Well which aims to improve end-of-life care for all. She is an advocate for palliative care education and endowed a program at California Pacific Medical Center to teach medical residents.

As a journalist, she has published articles about end of life and other medical topics in popular media including Newsweek, USA Today, Scientific American, TIME, Vox, San Francisco Chronicle and Stat and has appeared regularly as a medical expert contributor on CNN, MSNBC and Fox News as well as PBS NewsHour and CBSN.

In film, Ungerleider executive produced Netflix's Academy Award-nominated short documentary, End Game, by directors Rob Epstein and Jeffrey Friedman. She was a major funder of Netflix's Extremis, an Academy Award-nominated, Emmy-nominated short documentary by director, Dan Krauss. In 2020, Ungerleider executive produced Robin's Wish'', a feature-length documentary about the final years of actor and comedian Robin Williams.

In March 2018, she planned the San Francisco March for Our Lives rally to protest gun violence in schools where thousands marched from Civic Center Plaza to the Embarcadero (San Francisco).

End Well
Ungerleider founded endwellproject.org in 2017, a non-profit organization focused on education and awareness to improve the end of life experience where she remains President of the Board of Directors. The organization began as End Well Symposium; which first convened in 2017 in San Francisco and has also become an educational media platform. Its perspective ranges from culture, healthcare, design, business, technology to policy where notable individuals such as actress Taraji P. Henson, country music singer Tim McGraw, Bravo (American TV channel) reality host Andy Cohen, Dr. Atul Gawande, Dr. BJ Miller, singer Melissa Etheridge and others have spoken.

Awards
In 2018, Ungerleider was named to San Francisco Business Times 40 Under 40 class. In 2018, she was named Woman of the Year by Women Health Care Executives. She was named to Becker's Hospital Review, 90 healthcare leaders under 40 in 2018. In June 2020, Ungerleider was named a 2020 Changemaker by Hospice News, an aging and end of life industry publication.

Filmography

References

External links
 
 

Year of birth missing (living people)
Living people
21st-century American women physicians
21st-century American physicians
American women journalists
American film producers
University of Oregon alumni
Gottesman family